Wrong Plane is a Dutch producers/DJ formation mainly creating electro house, hard trance and Hands Up music.

Their first single Primera Linea was released on August 20, 2012 and directly added to DJ Dean's CD compilation Tunnel Trance Force and gained airplay on major radio stations in Germany like Sunshine Live.

The follow-up single Raumschiff (a cover of Major Tom by Peter Schilling was released in May 2013 on the Hamburger label Tunnel Records. 
Raumschiff was added to CD compilations such as Tunnel Trance Force and DJ Networx and remixed by the famous German DJ Dean.

On November 12, 2013, Wrong Plane released its third single Liebe on Berlin Madness, which was directly added again to a Tunnel Trance Force CD compilation and got into the German airplay charts (WDC50).

On September 8, 2014, their single Coming Home entered the British Dance Charts at #24.

Discography

 Primera Linea (2012)
 Raumschiff (2013)
 Liebe (2013)
 Airwalkers (2014)
 Coming Home (2014)
 We Love You (2014)
 The Reaper (Romeo & Juliet) (2015)

Discography Hit Quotation Singles International

References

External links

Tunnel Records Website 
Berlin Madness Website
Discogs Entry

Dutch electronic musicians
Dutch DJs
21st-century Dutch musicians
Living people
Musicians from Rotterdam
Club DJs
Electronic dance music DJs
Year of birth missing (living people)